Willis Wagner Wirth (1916–1994) was an American entomologist.  He was born in Dunbar, Nebraska.

1916 births
1994 deaths
American entomologists
People from Otoe County, Nebraska
20th-century Irish zoologists